A neophyte is a recent initiate or convert to a subject or belief.
 
Neophyte may also refer to:

Science
 Neophyte (botany), a plant species recently introduced to an area

As a proper noun

Arts and entertainment
 Neophyte, a character class in the online role playing game Secret of the Solstice
 Neophyte (band), a Dutch group that produces gabber/hardcore music
 Neophyte (comics), a character from Marvel Comics
 Neophyte (series), a 1999 series of freeware video games from Alien Software
 Neophyte, a recent initiate of a space marine Chapter in Warhammer 40,000 wargame
 Neophyte Redglare, a character in Homestuck

Other
 Neófito (Neophyte), a Native American baptized under the Spanish missions of California
 Neophyte (HBC vessel), operated by the HBC from 1946–1947, see Hudson's Bay Company vessels

See also
 

 Neofit (disambiguation)
 Neophytus (disambiguation)
 Newcomer (disambiguation)
 Novice (disambiguation)